First Baptist Church Education Building is a historic building at 317 Oak Street in Chattanooga, Tennessee.

It was built in 1928 to serve the congregation of the adjacent First Baptist Church, which had been built in 1886. Both buildings were designed by prominent local architect Reuben Harrison Hunt. Hunt was a member of the First Baptist Church, and the church building was his first major architectural project in Chattanooga. His design for the education building was intended to harmonize with the Romanesque design elements in the church, which was destroyed some time between 1928 and 1980.

The First Baptist Church Education Building was added to the National Register of Historic Places in 1980.

References

Baptist churches in Tennessee
Churches on the National Register of Historic Places in Tennessee
Churches completed in 1928
20th-century Baptist churches in the United States
Churches in Chattanooga, Tennessee
National Register of Historic Places in Chattanooga, Tennessee